Sigfrido Fontanelli (1 October 1947 – 20 February 2004) was an Italian racing cyclist. He won stage 12 of the 1976 Giro d'Italia.

References

External links
 

1947 births
2004 deaths
People from Montelupo Fiorentino
Italian male cyclists
Italian Giro d'Italia stage winners
Sportspeople from the Metropolitan City of Florence
Cyclists from Tuscany